The 1874 Yale Bulldogs football team represented Yale University in the 1874 college football season. The team finished with a 3–0 record and was retroactively named national champion by the National Championship Foundation and as co-national champion by Parke H. Davis. The team captain was Hugh J. McBirney.

Schedule

Standings

References

Yale
Yale Bulldogs football seasons
College football national champions
College football undefeated seasons
Yale Bulldogs football